Johnson City Historic District is a national historic district located at Johnson City, Broome County, New York.  It encompasses 183 contributing buildings and 1 contributing site in a mixed, residential, commercial, and industrial core of Johnson City.  It developed between about 1888 and 1966, and includes notable examples of Romanesque Revival, Gothic Revival, Colonial Revival, and Streamline Moderne style architecture.  Located in the district are the previously listed Goodwill Theatre, United States Post Office, and Your Home Library.  Other notable contributing resources include the Endicott-Johnson Athletic Association East Branch Recreational Center (1947), St. James Roman Catholic Church Complex (1914-1950), Ash Block (c. 1901), Tacoma Block (1892, 1945), Rich Block, Dawson Block (1898-1899), Woolworths (c. 1937), Men's Quality Shop (1966), Red Robin Diner (1950, 1959), Thompson Hall (1951), Sarah Jane Johnson Methodist Church (1927), Charles F. Johnson, Jr., House (1919), Endicott-Johnson's Pioneer Annex (1916), Endicott-Johnson's Jigger Factory (1926), Endicott-Johnson's Sunrise Building (1929), Eagle Felt Mill (1898), Ansco Factory and Gate House (1947), Endicott-Johnson's Medical Facility (1918), Endicott-Johnson's Victory Factory (1919-1920), Endicott-Johnson's New Toe Box Factory (1914), Endicott-Johnson's Firehouse (1916), and the Village Hall and Fire Station (1899).

It was added to the National Register of Historic Places in 2011.

Gallery

References

Historic districts on the National Register of Historic Places in New York (state)
Romanesque Revival architecture in New York (state)
Gothic Revival architecture in New York (state)
Colonial Revival architecture in New York (state)
Buildings and structures in Broome County, New York
National Register of Historic Places in Broome County, New York